Nicole Angat (born 9 April 1982) is a retired Papua New Guinean female tennis player.

Playing for Pacific Oceania at the Fed Cup, Angat had a win–loss record of 3–7.

She won the Pacific Games Silver Medal in Women's Doubles along with Abigail Tere-Apisah.

Angat retired from tennis in 2008.

Other finals

Doubles

Fed Cup participation

Singles

Doubles

ITF junior results

Singles (1/2)

Doubles (1/1)

References

External links 
 
 

1982 births
Living people
People from the National Capital District (Papua New Guinea)
Papua New Guinean female tennis players